Cadherin 5, type 2 or VE-cadherin (vascular endothelial cadherin) also known as CD144 (Cluster of Differentiation 144), is a type of cadherin. It is encoded by the human gene CDH5.

Function 

VE-cadherin is a classical cadherin from the cadherin superfamily and the gene is located in a six-cadherin cluster in a region on the long arm of chromosome 16 that is involved in loss of heterozygosity events in breast and prostate cancer. The encoded protein is a calcium-dependent cell–cell adhesion glycoprotein composed of five extracellular cadherin repeats, a transmembrane region and a highly conserved cytoplasmic tail. Functioning as a classic cadherin by imparting to cells the ability to adhere in a homophilic manner, the protein may play an important role in endothelial cell biology through control of the cohesion and organization of the intercellular junctions.

Integrity of intercellular junctions is a major determinant of permeability of the endothelium, and the VE-cadherin-based adherens junction is thought to be particularly important.   VE-cadherin is known to be required for maintaining a restrictive endothelial barrier – early studies using blocking antibodies to VE-cadherin increased monolayer permeability in cultured cells and resulted in interstitial edema and hemorrhage in vivo. A recent study has shown that TNFAIP3 (A20, a dual-ubiquitin editing enzyme) is essential for stability and expression of VE-cadherin. Deubiquitinase function of A20 was shown to remove ubiquitin chains from VE-cadherin, thereby prevented loss of VE-cadherin expression at the endothelial adherens junctions.

VE-cadherin is indispensable for proper vascular development – there have been two transgenic mouse models of VE-cadherin deficiency, both embryonic lethal due to vascular defects. Further studies using one of these models revealed that although vasculogenesis occurred, nascent vessels collapsed or disassembled in the absence of VE-cadherin. Therefore, it was concluded that VE-cadherin serves the purpose of maintaining newly formed vessels.

Interactions 

VE-cadherin has been shown to interact with:
 Beta-catenin
 Plakoglobin
 PTPRB
 Catenin (cadherin-associated protein), alpha 1
 CTNND1
 PTPmu (PTPRM)
 PTPrho (PTPRT)

As a biomarker
VE-Cadherin may serve as a biomarker for radiation exposure.

See also 
 Cluster of differentiation
 Endothelium

References

Further reading

External links 
 
 
 

Clusters of differentiation
Biomarkers